Art Pepper with Duke Jordan in Copenhagen 1981 is a live album by saxophonist Art Pepper and pianist Duke Jordan recorded in 1981 at the Jazzhus Montmartre by Danmarks Radio and released on the Galaxy label as a double CD in 1996.

Reception 

The AllMusic review by Steven McDonald noted "Art Pepper was in the process of dying at the time this recording was made, but there's no lack of energy, no loss of vitality. A two-CD live jazz set that's well worth having and should not be overlooked".

Track listing 
All compositions by Art Pepper except where noted.

Disc one
 "Blues Montmartre" – 14:01
 "What Is This Thing Called Love?" (Cole Porter) – 9:27
 "Over the Rainbow" (Harold Arlen, Yip Harburg) – 7:18
 "Caravan" (Juan Tizol, Duke Ellington, Irving Mills) – 15:48
 "Rhythm-a-Ning" (Thelonious Monk) – 14:26
 "You Go to My Head" (J. Fred Coots, Haven Gillespie) – 12:18

Disc two
 "Bésame Mucho" (Consuelo Velázquez, Sunny Skylar) – 22:06
 "Cherokee" (Ray Noble) – 8:46
 "Radio Blues" – 11:40
 "Good Bait" (Tadd Dameron, Count Basie) – 10:41
 "All the Things You Are" (Jerome Kern, Oscar Hammerstein II) – 15:28

Personnel 
Art Pepper – alto saxophone, clarinet
Duke Jordan – piano
David Williams – bass
Carl Burnett – drums

References 

Art Pepper live albums
Duke Jordan live albums
1996 live albums
Galaxy Records live albums
Albums recorded at Jazzhus Montmartre